The 1992 CCHA Men's Ice Hockey Tournament was the 21st CCHA Men's Ice Hockey Tournament. It was played between March 13 and March 21, 1992. First round games were played at campus sites, while 'final four' games were played at Joe Louis Arena in Detroit, Michigan. By winning the tournament, Lake Superior State received the Central Collegiate Hockey Association's automatic bid to the 1992 NCAA Division I Men's Ice Hockey Tournament.

Format
The tournament featured three rounds of play. The team that finished below eighth place in the standings was not eligible for postseason play. In the quarterfinals, the first and eighth seeds, the second and seventh seeds, the third seed and sixth seeds and the fourth seed and fifth seeds played a best-of-three series, with the winners advancing to the semifinals. In the semifinals, the remaining highest and lowest seeds and second highest and second lowest seeds play a single-game, with the winners advancing to the finals. The tournament champion receives an automatic bid to the 1992 NCAA Division I Men's Ice Hockey Tournament.

Conference standings
Note: GP = Games played; W = Wins; L = Losses; T = Ties; PTS = Points; GF = Goals For; GA = Goals Against

Bracket

Note: * denotes overtime period(s)

First round

(1) Michigan vs. (8) Ohio State

(2) Lake Superior State vs. (7) Illinois–Chicago

(3) Michigan State vs. (6) Ferris State

(4) Western Michigan vs. (5) Miami

Semifinals

(1) Michigan vs. (5) Miami

(2) Lake Superior State vs. (3) Michigan State

Consolation Game

(3) Michigan State vs. (3) Miami

Championship

(1) Michigan vs. (2) Lake Superior State

Tournament awards

All-Tournament Team
F Dwayne Norris (Michigan State)
F Brian Wiseman (Michigan)
F Brian Rolston (Lake Superior State)
D Pat Neaton (Michigan)
D Tim Hanley (Lake Superior State)
G Darrin Madeley* (Lake Superior State)
* Most Valuable Player(s)

References

External links
CCHA Champions
1991–92 CCHA Standings
1991–92 NCAA Standings

CCHA Men's Ice Hockey Tournament
Ccha tournament